Dániel Kiss may refer to:

 Daniel Kiss (footballer) (born 1984), Slovak goalkeeper
 Dániel Kiss (hurdler) (born 1982), Hungarian hurdler

See also
 Kiss Daniel (born 1994), Nigerian singer
 Danilo Kiš (1935–1989), Serbian writer